Moiynkum is a village (auyl) in southeastern Kazakhstan. It is the seat of Moiynkum District of Jambyl Region. Population: .

Geography
The village is located by the Chu river,  to the southeast of lake Kokuydynkol. It lies at the northeastern edge of the Moiynkum Desert.

References 

Populated places in Jambyl Region